McMasterville station is a commuter rail station operated by Exo in McMasterville, Quebec, Canada. 

It is served by the Mont-Saint-Hilaire line.

Connecting bus routes

CIT de la Vallée du Richelieu

References

External links
 McMasterville Commuter Train Station Information (RTM)
 McMasterville Commuter Train Station Schedule (RTM)

Exo commuter rail stations
Railway stations in Montérégie
Railway stations in Canada opened in 2000
2000 establishments in Quebec
La Vallée-du-Richelieu Regional County Municipality